Curtiss Helldiver may refer to the following aircraft
Curtiss F8C Helldiver, biplane reconnaissance bomber of the 1920s
Curtiss SBC Helldiver, biplane scout bomber of the 1930s.
Curtiss SB2C Helldiver, monoplane dive bomber of the 1940s, known as the Curtiss Helldiver in the Royal Navy